Salvia dorrii, the purple sage, Dorr's sage, fleshy sage, mint sage, or tobacco sage, is a perennial spreading shrub in the family Lamiaceae. It is native to mountain areas in the western United States and northwestern Arizona, found mainly in the Great Basin and southward to the Mojave Desert, growing in dry, well draining soils.

Description 
Salvia dorrii is a woody subshrub reaching  in height and width. The grey-green leaves are narrow and lanceolate, are tapered at the base and rounded at the tip generally without teeth or lobes. They have an intense but pleasant, mildly intoxicating minty aroma, with the scent released when the foliage is handled or crushed. The inflorescence is made up of spike-like clusters of numerous purple flowers that are bilaterally symmetric. Each calyx is usually . The upper lip is most often round without teeth or lobes. The lower lip lobes are pointed without spines. The color is variable, blue to purple to rose. The stamens and style protrude from the flower. The latter is forked at the tip. The flowers remain on the plants after being pollinated, with the desiccated flowers remaining for some weeks or months after flowering.

Ecology
It is a larval host plant to the elegant sphinx moth.

Uses and toxicity 
Some chemical components found in Salvia dorrii include salvidorol and two epimeric abietane diterpenes.

References

External links
 
 

dorrii
Flora of the California desert regions
Flora of the Great Basin
Flora of the Sierra Nevada (United States)
Flora of Utah
Flora of Nevada
Flora of Arizona
Flora of Colorado
Plants used in traditional Native American medicine
Flora without expected TNC conservation status